Peter Foldy is a Hungarian-born recording artist, film producer, director and screenwriter. He has been nominated for two Juno Awards and has had multiple top-ten hits across Canada and the U.S., most notably with his first song "Bondi Junction" which reached number one on the Canadian charts. He has written and directed numerous feature films working with actors such as Paul Rudd, Eugene Levy and Academy Award winner, Louise Fletcher.

Early life
Peter Foldy was born in Budapest, Hungary but soon fled from the then Communist regime with his parents and sister. The family moved to Sydney, where Foldy attended high school and worked as an actor in television commercials. During this time, he also forged a friendship with three young brothers who would later find worldwide success as the Bee Gees.

After a family move to Toronto, Foldy enrolled in film school at York University, once again landing occasional work in Canadian TV commercials. He also formed a rock band that performed in various bars and lounges throughout the city.

Career

Music

Kanata records
Foldy soon began writing songs and quickly landed a recording contract as an artist with a small indie label, Kanata Records. His first single, "Bondi Junction", was released in 1973 and the record eventually reached number one on RPM magazine's Adult Contemporary chart on July 7, 1973. Foldy was also featured on the cover of RPM that same week. The record received two Juno Award nominations, including Canadian Pop Music Single of the Year. He was also awarded a 1973 BMI Canada Certificate of Honour from BMI Canada for "Bondi Junction" which was a legitimate national hit across Canada.

Foldy was suddenly appearing on Canadian TV shows, on radio station charts and on the pages of music magazines, including the popular U.S. teen publication, 16 Magazine. "Bondi Junction" was also released in the U.S. on Playboy Records, a label started by Hugh Hefner, where it penetrated the U.S. market place. Cash Box reviewed the song as "a super commercial track that will immediately influence the teen set." The record also charted in Billboard.

Capitol-EMI and Polydor
In 1975, Foldy was signed by Capitol-EMI of Canada alongside a deal with Polydor in the U.S. His follow-up recordings, "Roxanne" and "Julie-Ann" also reached top-ten status on many charts across Canada, as well as in the U.S.

In 1976, he again received a BMI Canada Certificate of Honour for "Roxanne" and once again made the cover of RPM Weekly on July 3, 1976 (volume 25 #14).

Free Flight records
On the advice of his manager, Foldy left his deal with Capitol with the promise of bigger things in the United States which, unfortunately, failed to materialize. However, a pop label started by RCA Records in Los Angeles called Free Flight Records signed him a couple of years later. The move to Los Angeles allowed Foldy to continue his musical momentum with the self-written singles "Love City" and "School of Love", songs he co-produced with music producer, Tony Brown.

Bronte Road Music
In 2016, Foldy released a 10-track CD featuring all-new music entitled Nine Lives. All songs were written and produced by Foldy. The CD received favorable reviews and radio airplay, particularly the single, "Carly".
The album has received critical acclaim by both the Toronto Star and Cashbox Canada.

A new single, "Toxic World" was released in 2019. Written by Foldy, it was co-produced with Miklos Malek. In 2020 he released the single, "This Christmas" co-produced with Gerry Stober and in 2021, another single, "Friend-Zone" was released through Foldy's Bronte Road Music label, also co-produced by Foldy and Miklos Malek.

Film
When Free Flight Records abruptly closed its doors in 1981, Foldy turned his attention back to film, quickly selling his first screenplay, Hot Moves, which became a considerable theatrical and video hit in the mid-1980s. In more recent pop culture, the film has been dubbed as the possible inspiration for the 1999 Hollywood blockbuster American Pie.

More screenplays followed and in the early 1990s, Foldy started directing.

His feature film credits include:
 1993: Midnight Witness starring Jan-Michael Vincent and Maxwell Caulfield
 1994: Tryst with Barbara Carrera, David Warner and Academy Award winner Louise Fletcher
 1996: Widow's Kiss with former Foldy background singer, Beverly D'Angelo
 1998: Seeds of Doubt with Peter Coyote
 2000: Silver Man starring Eugene Levy and Joe Pantoliano
 2019: Love on Repeat starring Jen Lilley
 2021: Help Wanted ' with Sarah Fisher, Conner Floyd and Preston Ward.

Current projects
Foldy is in development on several feature films as well as two plays, Spin and Liverpool Lads. Spin is a humorous look at the resistance received by Canadian artists when Canadian content regulations were introduced in the early 1970s, while Liverpool Lads is the true story of the first songwriters signed to the Beatles company, Apple, after a random meeting with Paul McCartney in London's High Park.  It is based on the book, All You Need Is Luck... Or How I Got a Record Deal by Meeting Paul McCartney, written by Paul Tennant. McCartney has added a glowing quote to the back of the book.

An avid photographer, Foldy has exhibited his black and white photographs.

Discography

Albums

Singles

Filmography

References

External links
 Official website
 

Living people
Hungarian emigrants to Canada
Canadian male singer-songwriters
Canadian singer-songwriters
Canadian male screenwriters
Film producers from Ontario
Film directors from Toronto
Writers from Budapest
Writers from Toronto
20th-century Canadian screenwriters
21st-century Canadian screenwriters
Year of birth missing (living people)